The Tajik Autonomous Soviet Socialist Republic (Tajik ASSR) was an autonomous republic within the Uzbek SSR in the Soviet Union. It was created in October 1924 by a series of legal acts that partitioned the three existing regional entities in Central Asia – Turkestan ASSR, Bukharan People's Soviet Republic, and Khorezm People's Soviet Republic – into five new entities based on ethnic principles: Uzbek SSR, Turkmen SSR, Tajik ASSR (within Uzbek SSR), Kara-Kirghiz Autonomous Oblast (as a province of Russian SFSR), and Karakalpak Autonomous Oblast (as a province of Kazak ASSR).

The capital of Tajik ASSR was in Dyushambe (today known as Dushanbe). In October 1929, under the initiative of Shirinsho Shotemur, the Tajik ASSR was transformed into a full-fledged Soviet Socialist Republic and became Tajik SSR, which additionally absorbed the Khujand region (today's Sughd Province in northern Tajikistan) from Uzbek SSR. The capital Dyushambe was renamed Stalinabad in honor of Joseph Stalin.

Like in other Soviet Socialist Republics, the processes of industrialization and collectivization started in 1927 and continued until the end of the 1930s. Terror was often used to coerce farmers into forced collectivization, and this led to anti-government resistance in the years spanning from 1930 to 1936. Stalinist purges hit many members of the Communist Party of Tajikistan, and this led to the elimination of around 10,000 people (70% of the Party members). The people of Tajikistan suffered also from forced relocation: in the 1950s-1960s, inhabitants of the mountain regions of the country were deported to urban centers were workforce was needed, while in 1951-1952, 3,000 Basmachis were deported to Siberia.

References

Autonomous republics of the Soviet Union
States and territories established in 1924
Uzbek Soviet Socialist Republic
Tajik Soviet Socialist Republic
20th century in Tajikistan
Communism in Tajikistan

Former socialist republics
1924 establishments in the Soviet Union
1929 disestablishments in the Soviet Union